Gundoor is a village in Kalwakurthy Mandal, Nagarkurnool district, Telangana, India. It'
s pincode is 509324.

References

http://mahabubnagar.nic.in/

Villages in Nagarkurnool district